Gerald A. Calabrese (February 4, 1925 – April 13, 2015) was an American politician who served as Mayor of Cliffside Park, New Jersey continuously for 50 years, from 1965 to 2015. He was a member of the Democratic Party. Earlier in life, Calabrese played in the NBA for two seasons with the Syracuse Nationals.

Biography
Calabrese was a graduate of Cliffside Park High School, where he led the school's team to the state basketball championship. After serving in the United States Navy during World War II, he attended St. John's University, where he was chosen for All-American honors. He went on to a professional basketball career with the Syracuse Nationals, predecessor to today's Philadelphia 76ers.

Calabrese was elected to the Cliffside Park Borough Council in 1955, and then became mayor in 1959. He was re-elected as mayor in 1965 and served continuously as the borough's chief executive until his death in 2015. He was elected to the Bergen County Board of Chosen Freeholders in 1975, 1978 and 1982, and was Freeholder Director in 1984. From 1960 until January 1991, Calabrese was employed by the New Jersey Board of Public Utilities, retiring as the director of water and sewage. He also served as chairman of the Bergen County Democratic Organization for multiple years.

, Calabrese was the longest-serving mayor in the State of New Jersey. He secured hundreds of thousands of dollars, sometimes millions, every year for the borough of Cliffside Park and one of the longest-serving mayors in the United States.

After 50 continuous years as mayor, Calabrese died on April 13, 2015, at the age of 90.

References

External links
Basketball-Reference.com: Gerry Calabrese

1925 births
2015 deaths
American athlete-politicians
American men's basketball players
Basketball players from New Jersey
Cliffside Park High School alumni
County commissioners in New Jersey
Mayors of places in New Jersey
New Jersey Democrats
People from Cliffside Park, New Jersey
Sportspeople from Bergen County, New Jersey
St. John's Red Storm men's basketball players
Syracuse Nationals draft picks
Syracuse Nationals players
Utica Pros players
Wilkes-Barre Barons players
Point guards
United States Navy personnel of World War II